This is the list of episodes for The Tonight Show Starring Jimmy Fallon in 2023.

2023

January

February

March

References

Sources
 
 Lineups at Interbridge 

Episodes 2023
Lists of American non-fiction television series episodes
Lists of variety television series episodes